The Emory Wheel is the independent, student-run newspaper at Emory University in Atlanta, Georgia. The Wheel is published every other week on Wednesday during the regular school year, and is updated daily on its website. The sections of the Wheel include News, Opinion, Sports, Arts & Entertainment, Emory Life and Multimedia. The paper also produces The Hub, an award-winning quarterly magazine founded in 2005. Serving the Emory community since 1919, the Wheel is editorially and financially independent from the University. The staff is composed entirely of students. The Wheel offices are currently located in the Alumni Memorial University Center (AMUC). 

The Wheel'''s current editor-in-chief is Brammhi Balarajan.

History
OriginsThe Emory Wheel began in 1919 as a weekly newspaper with its offices located in the journalism department. The name is wordplay on an emery wheel, a sharpening device. An editorial published in the first issue of The Wheel explains that the newspaper will strive to sharpen the intellect of the University community. 

The newspaper, initially chartered by the Student Government Association, was originally meant to promote Emory's varsity level athletics and successfully lobbied to create an Emory track team.

Controversies
In the spring of 1970, a schism developed on the staff of the Wheel over the disputed election of Steve Johnson as editor. At that time the Wheel was being published twice a week. A competing newspaper was created, The Emory New Times. Both student newspapers were then published once weekly. J. Randolph Bugg, the losing candidate in the election for Wheel Editor, became the first editor of the New Times. After several years (and the graduation of all the aggrieved parties), the newspapers merged. For a while the publication was known as The Emory Wheel and New Times.

In October 2005, Wheel General Manager Eileen Smith of seven years  resigned amid controversy and animosity between the Wheel staff members and the University's Division of Campus Life. The Wheel Editorial Board maintained that Smith was pressured to resign by disapproving Campus Life administrators — a violation of the newspaper's independence from the University. Campus Life declined to comment. Smith signed an agreement not to discuss her resignation.

 Modernization 
In the spring of 2015, facing a changing media landscape, the Editorial Board moved to completely overhaul the paper's internal structures, design and content schedule. The paper changed to become a weekly print publication with a focus on producing daily online content. The Wheel itself changed from a broadsheet design to tabloid-sized news magazine. In addition to new branding and a revamped social media presence, the paper launched a new website. The board also formed new video and digital teams to assist the Wheel in its transition to a modern-day media publication. In 2016, the Wheel changed back to a broadsheet design. 

 The editorial board 
The Emory Wheel redefined the structure of its editorial board in a constitutional amendment in the spring of 2016. Under the amendment, the new editorial board will consist of the editor-in-chief and members of the Emory community who will debate and develop the paper's official stance on local and national issues. The new editorial structure allowed the Wheel to divide its news coverage and opinion writing. The change was proposed after the paper's coverage of the 2016 on-campus pro-Trump chalkings, during which the editor-in-chief "cut out all those who had touched the story" from participating in editorial discussions to maintain credibility and neutrality.

Circulation and distributionThe Emory Wheel prints 3,500 copies of the paper that are distributed throughout the main campus and surrounding areas. The newspaper's website, emorywheel.com, has all content available for free, electronic versions of the paper copies.

 Notable former staff members 
 Christopher McCandless, American hiker, subject of Into the Wild Carl Hiaasen, journalist, columnist and author
 Mike Sager, bestselling author and award-winning journalist
 Chris Megerian, politics and statehouse reporter, Los Angeles Times Henry Schuster, producer, 60 Minutes Leisha Chi, reporter, BBC World News
 Mitchell Tanzman, founding partner, co-chief executive officer and co-chief investment officer, Central Park Group; Emory trustee, Investment Committee chair
 Reid Epstein, political reporter and chief Washington wire writer, Wall Street Journal Andrew Ackerman, reporter, Wall Street Journal Robbie Brown, chief of staff to Bloomberg Media CEO and former consultant, The Boston Consulting Group
 Michelle Ye Hee Lee, reporter for Fact Checker, Washington Post Sam Borden, global sports correspondent, ESPN; formerly New York Times sports correspondent
 Ben Shpigel, sports reporter, New York Times Lindsay Jones, reporter, USA Today Sports Ben Volin, national NFL reporter, The Boston Globe''
 Frank Main, reporter, Pulitzer Prize winner

Editors-in-chief 
 Isaiah Poritz (2021-2022)
 Madison Bober (2020-2021)
Nicole Sadek and Niraj Naik (2019-2020)
 Michelle Lou (2018-2019)
 Julia Munslow (2017-2018)
 Zak Hudak (2016-2017)
 Dustin Slade (2015-2016)
 Priyanka Krishnamurthy (2014-2015)
 Arianna Skibell (2013-2014)
 Evan Mah (2012-2013)
 Molly Davis (2011-2012)
 Asher Smith (2010-2011)
 Michelle Ye Hee Lee (2009-2010)
 Salvador Rizzo (2008-2009)
 Chris Megerian (2007-2008)
 Robbie Brown (2006-2007) 
 Geoff Pallay (2005-2006)
 Rob Miller (2004-2005)
 Andrew Ackerman (2003-2004)
 Christopher Wang (2002-2003)
 Barney Gimbel (2001-2002)
 Reid Epstein (2000-2001)
 Kathleen P. Chapman (1998-1999)
 Kimberly Freeman (1997-1998)
 Brian Reid (1996- 1997)
 Marcy Lamm (1995-1996)
 Dan Sadowsky (1994-1995)
 David A. Simanoff (1993-1994)
 Adam Biegel (1992-1993)
 Suzanne Morrissey (1991-1992)
 David Marmins (1990-1991)
 Robert J. Binney (1988-1989)
 William Ernest Rogers (1919), founder

References

External links
Official website
Newspaper Manager’s Exit Spurs Concern at Emory

Student newspapers published in Georgia (U.S. state)
Newspapers published in Atlanta